Mary Morris (1915–1988) was a British actress.

Mary Morris may also refer to:
Mary Philipse Morris (1730–1825), American socialite
Mary Morris Knowles (1733–1807), née Morris, English Quaker poet and abolitionist
Mary Wells Morris (born 1764), namesake of Wellsboro, Pennsylvania
Mary Morris (doctor) (1873–1925), British doctor and suffragist
Mary Morris (American actress) (1895–1970)
Mary Morris (diarist) (1921–1997), Irish nurse and diarist
Mary McGarry Morris (born 1943), American novelist
Mary Morris (writer) (born 1947), American author

See also
May Morris (1862–1938), English craftswoman and designer